Yenma Ramírez (born 12 February 1984) is a Cuban handball player. She plays on the Cuban national team, and participated at the 2011 World Women's Handball Championship in Brazil.

References

1984 births
Living people
Cuban female handball players
Handball players at the 2015 Pan American Games
Pan American Games competitors for Cuba